Ruth Krefting  (22 September 1900, Kristiania – 19 December 1987, Oslo) was a Norwegian painter and playwright.

She was born in Kristiania to Annette Marie Hægstad and Axel K. Krefting, and was married to theatre director Anton Rønneberg. She was educated at the Norwegian National Academy of Craft and Art Industry and at the Norwegian National Academy of Fine Arts.

She painted landscapes, portraits and interiors, in particular interiors from farmers' houses. Se is represented with art works in several galleries in Norway, including the National Gallery of Norway. Her literary works include audio plays, as well as a biography of actress Aase Bye.

Selected works
Klosteret i St. Paul, Provence (painting; 1952) 
Kjøkkeninteriør (painting; 1955)
Vår i Frognerparken (painting; 1957)
Blått lys (audio play; 1957)
En klar dag (audio play; 1960)
Sand og spindelvev (audio play; 1962)
Skuespillerinnen Aase Bye (biography; 1963)

References

1900 births
1987 deaths
Artists from Oslo
Norwegian dramatists and playwrights
Norwegian biographers
Oslo National Academy of the Arts alumni
20th-century Norwegian painters
Writers from Oslo